The Year's Best S-F 11th Annual Edition is a science fiction anthology edited by Judith Merril first published in 1966.

Stories in The Year's Best S-F 11th Annual Edition
Introduction (1966) essay by Judith Merril
Something Else (1965) shortstory by Robert J. Tilley
The Volcano Dances (1964) shortstory by J. G. Ballard
Slow Tuesday Night (1965) shortstory by R. A. Lafferty
Better Than Ever (1965) shortstory by Alex Kirs
Coming-of-Age Day (1965) shortstory by A. K. Jorgensson
The Wall (1965) shortstory by Josephine Saxton
The Survivor (1965) novelette by Walter F. Moudy
Moon Duel (1965) shortstory by Fritz Leiber
Project Inhumane (1964) shortstory by Alexander B. Malec
Those Who Can, Do (1965) shortstory by Bob Kurosaka
Susan (1965) shortstory by Keith Roberts [aka Alistair Bevan]
Yesterdays' Gardens (1965) shortstory by Johnny Byrne
The Roaches (1965) shortstory by Thomas M. Disch
Game (1965) shortstory by Donald Barthelme
J Is for Jeanne (1965) shortstory by E. C. Tubb
Terminal (1965) shortstory by Ron Goulart
The Plot (1965) shortstory by Tom Herzog
Investigating the Bidwell Endeavors (1965) shortstory by David R. Bunch
The Case (1966) poem by Peter Redgrove
There's a Starman in Ward 7 (1965) shortstory by David Rome
Eyes Do More Than See (1965) shortstory by Isaac Asimov
Maelstrom II (1962) shortstory by Arthur C. Clarke
Two Telepathic Letters to Lord Kelvin (1965) shortstory by Alfred Jarry
Warrior (1965) shortstory by Gordon R. Dickson
Mars Is Ours! (1965) shortstory by Art Buchwald
Scarfe's World (1965) novelette by Brian W. Aldiss
Singular Case of Extreme Electrolyte Balance Associated with Folie a Deux (1965) shortfiction by Robert D. Tschirgi
A Magus (1965) poem by John Ciardi
The Circular Ruins (1962) shortstory by Jorge Luís Borges
The Girl Who Drew the Gods (1965) novelette by Harvey Jacobs
The Drowned Giant (1964) shortstory by J. G. Ballard
Circe Undersea (1965) poem by George MacBeth
Somewhere Not Far from Here (1965) shortstory by Gerald Kersh
In the Ruins (1965) shortstory by Roald Dahl
Traveller's Rest (1965) shortstory by David I. Masson
Ado About Nothing (1965) shortstory by Robert K. Ottum [aka Bob Ottum Jr.]
Summation (1966) essay by Judith Merril

References
 Goodreads listing for The Year's Best S-F 11th Annual Edition
 MIT Science Fiction Society's Library Pinkdex Entry for The Year's Best S-F 11th Annual Edition

1966 anthologies
Science fiction anthologies
Delacorte Press books